Davudlu or Dovudlu may refer to:
Davudlu, Agdash, Azerbaijan
Davudlu, Qubadli, Azerbaijan
Davudlu, Iran